Highbridge or High Bridge may refer to:

United Kingdom
Highbridge, Cumbria, a location
Highbridge, Hampshire, England
Highbridge, Somerset, a market town, England
Highbridge and Burnham railway station
Highbridge, Scotland, a village in the Scottish Highlands
Highbridge, West Midlands, a location
 Highbridge Skirmish, a battle site there
 High Bridge, Lincoln, the oldest bridge in the United Kingdom which still has buildings on it
 High Bridge, Oxford, over the River Cherwell
 High Bridge, Reading, over the River Kennet

United States
 High Bridge (New York City), connecting Highbridge, Bronx, to Washington Heights, Manhattan
Highbridge, Bronx, a neighborhood in New York City, US
Highbridge Park, Manhattan, New York, US
Highbridge (Metro-North station), a Metro-North employee stop and maintenance facility
 High Bridge (Kentucky River), a railroad bridge near Harrodsburg, Kentucky
 High Bridge, Kentucky
 High Bridge, New Jersey
High Bridge (NJT station), a NJ Transit commuter rail station
 High Bridge, New York
 Highbridge, Wisconsin
 High Bridge (Appomattox River), an historic railroad bridge near Farmville, Virginia
Battle of High Bridge fought at that location
High Bridge Trail State Park
 High Bridge (Coatesville, Pennsylvania), in Chester County
 High Bridge (St. Paul), crossing the Mississippi River in St. Paul, Minnesota
 High Bridge (Latah Creek), rail bridge over Latah Creek connecting West Spokane to Spokane, Washington
 High Bridge is an alternate name for the Poughkeepsie Bridge, across the Hudson River in New York

See also
HighBridge, an audiobook imprint of Workman Publishing Company
High Level Bridge (disambiguation)